New Glenn is a heavy-lift orbital launch vehicle in development by Blue Origin. Named after NASA astronaut John Glenn, design work on the vehicle began in 2012. Illustrations of the vehicle, and the high-level specifications, were initially publicly unveiled in September 2016. Its first stage will be powered by seven BE-4 engines that are also being designed and manufactured by Blue Origin.

Like the New Shepard suborbital launch vehicle that preceded it, the New Glenn's first stage has been designed to be reusable since its inception. In 2021, the company initiated conceptual design work on approaches to potentially make the second stage reusable as well, with the project codenamed Project Jarvis.

Originally aiming for first launch of New Glenn in 2020, Blue Origin has publicly announced delays on three occasions: to 2021 in late 2018, to fourth quarter of 2022 in early 2021, and to no earlier than Q4 2023 in March 2022.

History 
After initiating the development of an orbital rocket system prior to 2012, and stating in 2013 on their website that the first stage would do a powered vertical landing and be reusable, Blue Origin publicly announced their orbital launch vehicle intentions in September 2015. In January 2016, Blue Origin indicated that the new rocket would be many times larger than New Shepard even though it would be the smallest of the family of Blue Origin orbital vehicles. Blue Origin publicly released the high-level design of the vehicle and announced the name New Glenn — with both two-stage and three-stage variants planned — in September 2016.

Early development work on orbital subsystems 
Blue Origin began developing systems for orbital human spacecraft prior to 2012. A reusable first-stage booster was projected to fly a suborbital trajectory, taking off vertically like the booster stage of a conventional multistage launch vehicle. Following stage separation, the upper stage would continue to propel astronauts to orbit while the first-stage booster would descend to perform a powered vertical landing similar to its New Shepard suborbital vehicle. The first-stage booster was to be refueled and relaunched to reduce costs of access for humans to space.

The booster launch vehicle was projected to lift Blue Origin's biconic Space Vehicle capsule  to orbit, carrying astronauts and supplies. After completing its mission in orbit, the Space Vehicle was designed to reenter Earth's atmosphere and land under parachutes on land, to be reused on future missions.

Engine testing for the (then-named) Reusable Booster System (RBS) launch vehicle began in 2012. A full-power test of the thrust chamber for Blue Origin BE-3 liquid oxygen/liquid hydrogen upper-stage rocket engine (BE-3U) was conducted on a stand at the John C. Stennis Space Center (NASA test facility) in October 2012. By early 2018, it was announced that the BE-3U hydrolox engine would power the second stage of the New Glenn.

Orbital launch vehicle 
Design work on the vehicle began in 2012, with the beginning of BE-4 engine development. Further plans for an orbital launch vehicle were made public in 2015. By March 2016, the launch vehicle was referred to by the placeholder name of "Very Big Brother". It was stated to be a two-stage-to-orbit liquid-propellant rocket, with the launcher intended to be reusable. In early 2016, Blue Origin indicated that the first orbital launch was expected no earlier than 2020 from the Florida launch facility, and in September 2017 continued to forecast a 2020 debut. In a February 2016 interview, Blue Origin president Rob Meyerson referred to engine development and orbital launch vehicle milestones.

The vehicle itself, and the high-level specifications, were initially publicly unveiled in September 2016. New Glenn was described as a  diameter, two- or three-stage rocket, with the first and second stages being liquid methane/liquid oxygen (methalox) designs using Blue Origin engines. The first stage is planned to be reusable and will land vertically, just like the New Shepard suborbital launch vehicle that has been flying suborbitally since the early 2010s. Although these plans would subsequently change, the 2016 plans called for the first stage to be powered by seven of Blue Origin's BE-4 single-shaft oxygen-rich staged combustion liquid methane/liquid oxygen rocket engines, the second-stage to be powered by a single vacuum-variant of the BE-4 (BE-4U) and the third stage to use a single BE-3 hydrolox engine. In 2016, the first stage was planned to be designed to be reused for up to 100 flights. Blue Origin announced that they intended to launch the rocket from Launch Complex 36 (LC-36), and manufacture the launch vehicles at a new facility to be built on nearby land in Exploration Park. Acceptance testing of the BE-4 engines was also announced to be planned for Florida.

Blue explained in the 12 September 2016 announcement that the rocket would be named New Glenn in honor of the first American astronaut to orbit the Earth, John Glenn. Three weeks of wind tunnel testing of a scale model New Glenn were completed in September 2016 in order to validate the CFD design models of transonic and supersonic flight.

In March 2017, Jeff Bezos showed graphics of the New Glenn which had two large strakes at the bottom of the booster.

By March 2018, the launch vehicle design had changed. It was announced that the New Glenn second stage will now be powered by two vacuum versions of the flight proven BE-3 liquid hydrogen/liquid oxygen rocket engine (BE-3U) with a single BE-3U engine for the third stage deep space option. The three stage booster variant was subsequently cancelled completely in January 2019. By mid-2018, the low-level design was not yet complete and the likelihood of achieving an initial launch by 2020 was being called into question by company engineers, customers, industry experts, and journalists. In October 2018, the Air Force announced Blue Origin was awarded US$500 million for development of New Glenn as a potential competitor in future contracts, including Evolved Expendable Launch Vehicle (EELV) Phase 2. The October 2018 award was terminated in December 2020 after receiving US$255.5 million of the US$500 million.

By February 2019, several launches for New Glenn had been contracted: five for OneWeb, an unspecified amount of Telesat, one each for Eutelsat, mu Space Corp and SKY Perfect JSAT. In February 2019, Blue Origin indicated that no plans to build a reusable second stage were on the company's roadmap.  In the event, by July 2021, Blue was evaluating options for getting to a reusable second-stage design: Project Jarvis.

In August 2020 the Air Force announced that New Glenn was not selected for the National Security Space Launch Phase 2 launch procurement. Due to this, in February 2021 Blue Origin announced that the first flight would slip to no earlier than late 2022.

By December 2020, Blue Origin indicated that the BE-4 engine delivery to ULA would slip to summer 2021, and ULA disclosed that the first launch of the New Glenn competitor ULA Vulcan Centaur would now be no earlier than 4Q 2021. Blue announced a further schedule slip for the first launch of New Glenn in March 2021 when the company said New Glenn "would not launch until the fourth quarter of 2022, at the earliest."

By 2021, Blue had reduced the published reuse specification for New Glenn to a minimum of 25 flights, from the previous design of 2016 to support up to 100 flights.

By March 2022, planning for the first flight of New Glenn had slipped to no earlier than January 2023

"Jarvis" reusable upper stage 

Information became public in July 2021 that Blue Origin had begun a "project to develop a fully reusable upper stage for New Glenn," under the name "Project Jarvis", just as SpaceX is aiming to do with their Starship second stage. If Blue is able to realize such a second stage design and bring it into operational use, New Glenn would become a fully-reusable launch vehicle and would benefit from a substantial reduction in cost per launch.

Beyond the technical changes indicated, Bezos has created a new management structure for the new efforts, walling off "parts of the second-stage development program from the rest of Blue Origin [telling] its leaders to innovate in an environment unfettered by rigorous management and paperwork processes." No budget has been publicly released.

One part of the effort is focusing on developing a stainless steel propellant tank and main structure for the second stage rocket, and evaluating it as a part of a solution for a complete second stage system.  By 24 August, Blue had rolled a stainless steel test tank to their Launch Complex 36 facility, on which ground pressure testing with cyrogenic propellants could begin as early as September.

In addition to the Jarvis team working on a new second stage tank design, Blue Origin has set up another team to focus on design approaches that might be used to make a New Glenn second stage reusable, something that was not a design objective for the original second stage for New Glenn prior to 2021. , three approaches are being explored: adding wings to allow the stage to operate as a spaceplane on reentry; using an aerospike engine on the second stage that could double as a heat shield on reentry; and an approach similar to SpaceX's Starship concept using high-drag flaps in combination with propulsive deceleration.  A decision on which approach to take into full development was slated for later in 2021.

Description and technical specifications 

The New Glenn is a  diameter two-stage orbital launch vehicle with a reusable first stage  and an expendable second stage. An optional third stage was envisaged with a single BE-3U engine, and was planned as of October 2018.

The first stage is designed to be reusable for a minimum of 25 flights, and will land vertically, a technology previously developed by Blue Origin and tested in 2015–2016 on its New Shepard suborbital launch vehicle. The second stage will share the same diameter as the first and use two BE-3U vacuum optimized engines. It will use hydrogen/oxygen as propellant and will be expendable. This engine is manufactured by Blue Origin. Dual-satellite launches will be offered after the first five flights.

Both stages will use orthogrid aluminum tanks with welded aluminum domes and common bulkheads. Both stages will also use autogenous pressurization. The first stage will be powered by seven BE-4 methane/oxygen engines — designed and manufactured by Blue Origin — producing  of liftoff thrust. The second stage will be powered by two BE-3U engines, also designed and manufactured by Blue Origin. BE-3Us are an expander cycle variant of the BE-3 engine, which are explicitly designed for use in upper stages.

Launches of the New Glenn are planned to be made from Launch Complex 36 (LC-36), which was leased to Blue Origin in 2015. A launch site at Vandenberg Space Force Base is also planned. New Glenn will also be available for space tourism flights, with priority given to customers of New Shepard. The first stage boosters of New Glenn are intended to be reusable, and were originally intended to be recovered downrange on the Atlantic Ocean via their landing platform ship Jacklyn, which would have acted as a floating movable landing platform. The hydrodynamically stabilized ship would have increased the likelihood of successful recovery in rough seas. Currently there are no clear plans to follow through with ship based recovery as they have scrapped Jacklyn, and the ship has now been sold for scrap. It is not known yet what this means for the reusability of New Glenn. Blue origin could use a barge, similar to how SpaceX currently recovers their boosters, but this could potentially be complicated due to its size.

Manufacturing 
The main assembly of the New Glenn launch vehicle will occur in the Blue Origin rocket manufacturing facility in Florida, near Launch Complex 36 (LC-36) which the company leased from Spaceport Florida. Launch Complex 36 (LC-36) has hosted more than 100 launches, formerly launching the Atlas II and Atlas III.

Tooling and equipment for the factory began to be ordered and built in 2015. It will be installed in the Florida facility in Exploration Park later in 2018. , Blue Origin had invested over US$1 billion in its Florida manufacturing facility and launch site, and intends to spend much more going forward.

Launch services 
Blue will offer both single-payload dedicated flights and, after the fifth launch, dual-manifesting of large communications satellites to be transported to geostationary transfer orbit (GTO). All contracted launches from the start will feature a reusable first-stage, so just like the practice in commercial aircraft transport, landing conditions can affect the timing and flight parameters of a launch.

Launch service customers 
By 2018, Blue Origin had contracts in place with four customers for New Glenn flights. Eutelsat, Thailand startup mu Space Corp and SKY Perfect JSAT have geosynchronous orbit communications satellite launches planned after 2020, while internet satellite constellation fleet operator OneWeb has an agreement for five launches.

In January 2019, Telesat signed a multi-launch contract "to launch satellites for its future low-Earth-orbit broadband constellation on multiple New Glenn missions" and thus is Blue's fifth customer.

In 2022, Amazon announced that it had contracted 15 flights of New Glenn, with an option for 18 more, for deployment of the Kuiper satellite constellation. Amazon, founded by Blue Origin owner Jeff Bezos, had also ordered 38 launches of Vulcan from ULA and 18 launches of Ariane 6 from Arianespace.

Schedule-oriented launch cadence 
Blue intends to contract its launch services 
in a different structure compared to contract options that have been traditionally offered in the commercial launch market. The company has stated they will contract to aim to have a regular launch cadence of up to eight launches a year. If one of the payload providers for a multi-payload launch is not ready on time, Blue will hold to the launch timeframe, and fly the remaining payloads on time at no increase in price. This is different from how dual-launch manifested contracts have been traditionally handled by Arianespace (Ariane 5 and Ariane 6) and Mitsubishi Heavy Industries (H-IIA and H3). SpaceX and International Launch Services can offer dual-launch contracts, but prefer dedicated missions.

Funding 
The development and manufacture of the New Glenn is being funded by Jeff Bezos, founder of Amazon.com, and the Department of the Air Force. Initially funded entirely by Bezos, after 2019 New Glenn will also receive US$500 million in funding under the United States Space Force National Security Space Launch (NSSL) program. By September 2017, Bezos had invested US$2.5 billion into New Glenn.

See also 

 Space launch market competition
 Falcon Heavy (SpaceX)
 Ariane 6 (Arianespace)
 Vulcan Centaur (United Launch Alliance)
 SpaceX Starship (SpaceX)
 Space Launch System (NASA/Boeing), not intended for commercial satellite launch
 Saturn C-3 (1962 NASA Saturn design for Apollo EOR), same height and lift capacity
 Comparison of orbital launch systems
 Comparison of orbital launchers families

References

External links 

 
 New Glenn: The Road to Space on YouTube by Blue Origin

Blue Origin launch vehicles
Space tourism
VTVL rockets
Proposed reusable launch systems
John Glenn